50 Fountain Plaza, formerly the Key Center North Tower, is a high-rise located in Buffalo, New York, USA. It is the eighth tallest building in Buffalo at 275 feet (85 m) and 17 stories tall. The building has a twin tower next door, 40 Fountain Plaza (formerly Key Center South Tower) which is four stories shorter and connected by a two-story glass atrium encompassing 18,800 square feet of retail space. Once known as the Key Center, the complex is now simply known as Fountain Plaza after KeyBank moved out. Both buildings have distinctive pyramid tops that are trimmed with LED lighting strips which are illuminated at night and can change color for specific occasions or holidays.  In the front of the two towers is a large fountain in the summer. In the winter, it serves as an outdoor ice rink that is free to the public.

Tenants 
Formerly home to KeyBank's Buffalo operations, the building is home to operations of Labatt Brewing Company's North American breweries sales and marketing and others.

Gallery

See also
 List of tallest buildings in Buffalo

References

Twin towers
Skyscraper office buildings in Buffalo, New York
Office buildings completed in 1990
Modernist architecture in New York (state)
1990 establishments in New York (state)